J.CO Donuts & Coffee is an Indonesian cafe restaurant chain that specializes in donuts, coffee and frozen yogurt. The company is owned and managed by Johnny Andrean Group.

Business Growth
The first J.CO opened on June 26, 2005. In four months, the outlet made money and continued growing. On its eighth year, J.CO had 120 outlets in Indonesia, 12 in Malaysia and the Philippines, 4 in Singapore and 2 in China.

J.CO is the fastest growing donut and coffee chain in Indonesia with 236 stores opened since 2005. They have successfully penetrated into the local market in Indonesia against Krispy Kreme and Dunkin' Donuts to become one of the market leaders for donuts and coffee.

In terms of international growth, they have been rapidly expanding their store chains throughout Southeast Asian countries such as Indonesia, Malaysia, Singapore, Philippines and Hong Kong, bringing the total store count to over 275 chains in 2017. As of 2017, it has five stores in Singapore, 18 in Malaysia, two in Hong Kong and 45 in the Philippines

J.CO opened its first branch in Indonesia in 2005 with a total 236 stores in 2020. In Singapore, they opened their first branch in 2008 with a total of 3 stores. In 2012, J.CO entered the Philippines with now 57 stores opened as of 2022.  In December 2016, J.CO opened its first branch in Hong Kong.. It currently has 3 stores in Hong Kong.

Products
J.CO's donut flavors are either named using eponyms or word plays such as puns. One example is, Alcapone, the most popular donut flavor, inspired by most-wanted Italian American gangster Al Capone. As of 2017, they have launched over 45 flavors, some of which are inspired by local tastes such as their kaya donut and kurma donut.

Some complementary products they sell include J.CRONUT (croissant donuts), J.POPS (mini bite-size donuts), J.CLUB (donut sandwiches), J.COOL (frozen yogurt), and gourmet selections of pastries, sandwiches and salads. The J.COFFEE line features a variety of coffee beverages ranging from the classics to iced blends.

Gallery

See also

 List of coffeehouse chains

References

External links
J.CO Donuts Official site
J.CO Malaysia Facebook-group

Companies based in Jakarta
Restaurants established in 2005
Fast-food chains of Indonesia
Indonesian brands
Doughnut shops
Coffeehouses and cafés
Fast-food chains of Singapore
Indonesian companies established in 2005
Coffee in Indonesia